Li Qin (born 27 September 1990), also known as Sweet Li, is a Chinese actress.

Li is noted for her roles in The Dream of Red Mansions (2010), The Founding of a Party (2011), White Deer Plain (2017),  Princess Agents (2017), Joy of Life (2019), Jade Dynasty (2019), The Captain (2019), The Song of Glory (2020), The Wolf (2020), Warm Hug (2020), My Dear Guardian (2021), and Tears in Heaven (2021).

Early life
Li was born in Bacheng Town of Kunshan city, Jiangsu province on September 27, 1990. At the age of 11, Li studied Chinese traditional opera in Shipai Central School.

She graduated from the Affiliated Chinese Opera School of Shanghai Theatre Academy in 2008, majoring in kunqu.

Career

2010–2016: Debut and rising popularity
Li first rose to prominence in 2010 for playing Xue Baochai in the television series The Dream of Red Mansions, based on the novel by the same name by Cao Xueqin. She won the Best New Actress award at the TVS Award Ceremony for her performance.

In 2011, Li made her film debut in The Founding of a Party, playing Yang Kaihui. She was nominated for the Best Newcomer Award at the 31st Hundred Flowers Awards. She again played Yang Kaihui in China in 1921, another patriotic tribute production.

In 2012, Li starred in the romantic melodrama television series The Watchful Sky, which won the Gold Angel Award at the 9th Sino-US Film Festival. In 2013, Li starred in romance dramas Shining Days and The Return of a Princess , both of which attained high ratings during their respective runs.

In 2014, Li starred in romance drama If I Love You, and was named the Most Promising Actress at the China TV Drama Awards for her performance. In 2015, Li starred in her first historical drama My Amazing Bride, playing a quirky and adorable heiress.

2017–present: Acclaim and transition to mainstream popularity
In 2017, Li starred in the television adaptation of the classic novel White Deer Plain. Her performance as Tian Xiao'e was a "pitch-perfect illustration of a rural woman's miserable life" according to critics, and stood in sharp contrast to her previous performances as youthful and innocent characters. Li was nominated for the Best Supporting Actress award at the Magnolia Awards for her performance. The same year, Li starred in the historical action drama Princess Agents, playing a princess of a befallen kingdom. The drama was a major success and led to increased popularity of Li. That year, Li entered Forbes China Celebrity 100 list for the first time, ranking 100th.

In 2018, Li was nominated at the Hundred Flowers Award for Best Actress for her portrayal of Yang Kaihui in the patriotic film The Founding of an Army. The same year, she played the role of Fragrant Concubine in the palace drama Ruyi's Royal Love in the Palace. Forbes China listed Li under their 30 Under 30 Asia 2017 list  which consisted of 30 influential people under 30 years old who have had a substantial effect in their fields.

In 2019, Li played the female lead Lu Xueqi in the film adaptation of the xianxia novel Zhu Xian, titled Jade Dynasty. She then co-starred in the aviation disaster film The Captain as a flight attendant, and received the Best Supporting Actress award at the Gold Crane Awards held by the Tokyo International Film Festival. The same year, she starred in the historical political drama Joy of Life, and gained attention for her role as the drumstick lady.

In 2020, Li appeared in CCTV New Year's Gala for the first time, performing the song item "Hello 2020". The same year, she starred in the historical drama The Song of Glory as the daughter of a military family. She also starred in the comedy film Warm Hug.
She ranked 72nd on Forbes China Celebrity 100 list in 2020.

Endorsements
In 2018, Li was selected as brand ambassador for cosmetics brand SK-II. 

Since 2021, Italian-inclusive luxury brand Furla has announced that Li will serve as the brand's spokesperson. In 2021, she was also become the first brand spokesperson for Laura Mercier Cosmetics in the Asia-Pacific region.

Filmography

Film

Television series

Variety show

Discography

Awards and nominations

References

External links

1990 births
Actresses from Suzhou
Living people
Chinese film actresses
Chinese television actresses
Singers from Suzhou
Musicians from Suzhou
21st-century Chinese actresses
21st-century Chinese women singers
Affiliated Chinese Opera School of Shanghai Theatre Academy alumni